Bárðarbunga, is a stratovolcano located under Vatnajökull in Vatnajökull National Park which is Iceland's most extensive glacier.

Description
Bárðarbunga is a subglacial stratovolcano under the ice cap of Vatnajökull glacier in the Vatnajökull National Park in Iceland. The surrounding edges rise to 1,850 metres, but the base is on average close to 1,100 metres. The volcano is covered in ice to a depth of 850m, hiding the glacier-filled crater. The associated volcanic system and fissure swarm is about 190 km long and 25 km wide.

Bárðarbunga was a little-known volcano in Iceland due to its remote location and infrequent eruptions approximately once every 50 years, but recent studies have shown that many tephra layers originally thought to be from other volcanoes were ejected from Bárðarbunga.

Sustained seismic activity has been gradually increasing in Bárðarbunga and its associated northern fissure system for seven years starting in 2007 and leading to an eruption towards the end of 2014. This activity decreased after the Grímsvötn eruption in 2011, but later returned to a similar level as before the eruption. The previous eruption was in 1910. There has been frequent volcanic activity outside the glacier to the southwest in the highlands between Vatnajökull and Mýrdalsjökull, and also to the northeast toward Dyngjufjöll .

Etymology
Bárðarbunga is named after an early Icelandic settler named Gnúpa-Bárður , and literally translates as "Bárður's bulge" or "Bárður's bump" since "Bárðar" is the genitive case of "Bárður".

Eruptions and notable activity
Throughout history there have been large eruptions every 250–600 years. In 1477, the largest known eruption from Bárðarbunga had a volcanic explosivity index (VEI) of 6; there is evidence of many smaller eruptions during the past 10,000 years.

6600 BC
Þjórsá Lava, the largest Holocene lava flow on earth, originated from Bárðarbunga about 8,600 years ago, with a total volume of 21 to 30 cubic kilometres and covering approximately 950 square kilometres.

870
Many large eruptions have occurred south-west of the glacier; the first occurring since human settlement of Iceland was the Vatnaöldur eruption about 870 which had a volcanic explosivity index (VEI) of 4.

1477
The Veiðivötn eruption in 1477 is the largest known Icelandic eruption, with a VEI of 6.

1701–1864
Studies of tephra layers have shown that a number of eruptions have occurred beneath the glacier, probably in the north-east of the crater or in Bárðarbunga. There have also been smaller eruptions in an ice-free area of Dyngjuháls  to the north-east. Eruptions appear to follow a cycle: there were several eruptions in the glacier between 1701 and 1740 and since 1780.

1910 eruption
1910 was the last known eruption of Bárðarbunga before the 2014 eruptions.

1996

The Gjálp fissure vent eruption in 1996 revealed that an interaction may exist between Bárðarbunga and Grímsvötn. A strong earthquake in Bárðarbunga, about 5 on the Richter scale, is believed to have started the eruption in Gjálp. On the other hand, because the magma erupted showed strong connections to the Grímsvötn Volcanic System as petrology studies showed, the 1996 as well as a former eruption in the 1930s are thought to have taken place within Grímsvötn Volcanic system.

2010
On 26 September 2010, an earthquake swarm was recorded with over 30 earthquakes measuring up to 3.7MW on the moment magnitude scale.

2014–2015

In August 2014, a swarm of around 1,600 earthquakes in 48-hours, with magnitudes up to 4.5MW,
 was followed on 23 August by the USGS Aviation Color Codes being raised from orange to red, indicating an eruption in progress. The following day, the aviation risk was lowered from red to orange and the statement that there was an eruption in progress was retracted. However, later aerial observations of glacial depressions southeast of the volcano suggested that the now-retracted report of an eruption had been correct and that a short eruption did occur under the ice, but the lack of further melting indicated that this eruption had now ceased. Then, a new fissure eruption breached the surface between Bárðarbunga and Askja, in the Holuhraun lava field, in the early hours of 29 August. This was followed by a second fissure eruption in the Holuhraun area, along the same volcanic fissure, which started shortly after 4 am on 31 August.

The eruption emitted large volumes of sulphur dioxide and impacted air quality in Iceland. There was no effect on flights outside of the immediate vicinity as the eruption hadn't produced a significant amount of volcanic ash.

On February 28, 2015 it was officially reported that the eruption was over. Nevertheless, the gas pollution still existed, and the area north of Bárðarbunga, including volcanoes Askja and Herðubreið, still remained closed for visitors.

On March 16, 2015 the area north of Bárðarbunga was opened for visitors, excluding the new lava field and the area within 20 metres around it.

1950 Geysir air crash

On 14 September 1950 a Douglas C-54 Skymaster aircraft belonging to the Icelandic airline Loftleiðir crash landed on the Vatnajökull glacier at Bárðarbunga during a cargo flight from Luxembourg to Reykjavík. There were no fatalities, but damaged radio equipment left them unable to communicate their location. After two days the crew managed to reach the emergency transmitter in the plane's rubber liferaft and send out an distress call which was picked up by the Icelandic Coast Guard vessel Ægir. The same day a search and rescue Catalina aircraft, named Vestfirðingur, spotted them. The C-54's cargo included the body of a deceased United States Air Force (USAF) colonel, prompting American assistance. A USAF C-47 equipped with skis landed on the glacier but was unable to take off again, so it had to be abandoned. After six days both crews were rescued by a ski-patrol from Akureyri. Later Loftleiðir bought the stranded C-47 from the USAF for $700. In April 1951 it was dug out of the snow and towed down the mountain by two bulldozers, where it was started and flown to Reykjavík.

See also
 List of volcanoes in Iceland
 Timeline of volcanism on Earth
 Volcanism of Iceland

References

External links 
 Bárðarbunga in the Catalogue of Icelandic Volcanoes
 3d map of volcanic activity and webcam at Bárðarbunga updated live from IMO
 Bárðarbunga live webcams feed
 Michigan Tech Geological Engineering and Sciences – Bárðarbunga/Grimsvötn Volcanoes
 Seismic activity in the Vatnajökull region
 Bárðarbunga volcano livestream
 (The Bárðarbunga System), pre-publication extract from The Catalogue of Icelandic Volcanoes
 Official Website of Vatnajökull National Park

 
Active volcanoes
Calderas of Iceland
Central volcanoes of Iceland
East Volcanic Zone of Iceland
Mountains of Iceland
Stratovolcanoes of Iceland
Subglacial calderas
Subglacial volcanoes of Iceland
Two-thousanders of Iceland
VEI-6 volcanoes
Volcanic systems of Iceland